The Espey Boarding House, also known as the DeCicco Building, was an historic building located at 2601–2605 Southwest Water Avenue, in Portland, Oregon. The structure was completed , and added to the National Register of Historic Places in 1979. It was razed on November 28, 1988.

See also
 National Register of Historic Places listings in Southwest Portland, Oregon

References

1886 establishments in Oregon
1988 disestablishments in Oregon
Buildings and structures completed in 1886
Demolished buildings and structures in Portland, Oregon
Southwest Portland, Oregon
Buildings and structures demolished in 1988